The Râușor is a right tributary of the river Bratia in Romania. It flows into the Bratia in the village Gămăcești.

References

Rivers of Romania
Rivers of Argeș County